Florence is an unincorporated community in Hanover Township, Washington County, in the U.S. state of Pennsylvania.

History
Florence was laid out in 1814.

References

External links
 "Florence: Old Pictures (1932)." Hanover Township, Pennsylvania (retrieved online July 1, 2019).

Unincorporated communities in Washington County, Pennsylvania
Unincorporated communities in Pennsylvania